National Highway 527A, commonly referred to as NH 527A is a national highway in  India. It is a spur road of National Highway 27. NH-527A traverses the state of Bihar in India.

Route 
NH527A connects Pokhrauni Chowk, Madhubani, Rampatti, Jhanjharpur, Samey Chowk, Awam, Laufa, Rahua-Sangram, Bheja, Bakaur and Parsarma in the state of Bihar.

Tourist places adjacent to highway 

 Bideshwar Sthan
 Parasmaninath Mandir
 Laxminath gosain sthal

Junctions  

  Terminal near Pokhrauni.
  near Jhanjharpur.
  Terminal near Parsarma.

See also 

 List of National Highways in India by highway number
 List of National Highways in India by state

References

External links 

 NH 527A on OpenStreetMap

National highways in India
National Highways in Bihar